Ivan Hrdlička (born 20 November 1943) is a former Slovak football player. He played for Czechoslovakia, playing 17 matches and scoring two goals. 
He was a participant at the 1970 FIFA World Cup.

He played mostly for Slovan Bratislava and also for Zbrojovka Brno. He coached ŠKP Dúbravka, Slovan Bratislava and 1. FC Brno.

References

1943 births
Association football midfielders
Slovak footballers
Czechoslovak footballers
1970 FIFA World Cup players
Living people
Czechoslovakia international footballers
ŠK Slovan Bratislava managers
FC Zbrojovka Brno players
Slovak football managers
Czechoslovak football managers
FC Zbrojovka Brno managers
Footballers from Bratislava
ŠK Slovan Bratislava players